Ana Bucik (born 21 July 1993) is a Slovenian World Cup alpine ski racer.

Bucik has competed in four World Championships and her best result is seventh in the slalom in 2017.  She made her World Cup debut at age sixteen in January 2010 and her first podium came in a super-combined in January 2018. Her previous best result was in Slovenia at Maribor in January 2017 with seventh place in the slalom and the best time in the second run.

World Cup results

Season standings

Race podiums
 0 wins
 1 podium – (1 AC); 20 top tens

World Championships results

Olympic results

References

External links

 

 

1993 births
Slovenian female alpine skiers
Living people
People from Nova Gorica
Alpine skiers at the 2018 Winter Olympics
Alpine skiers at the 2022 Winter Olympics
Olympic alpine skiers of Slovenia